Copyright Act (with its variations) is a stock short title used for legislation in Australia, Canada, Hong Kong, India, Malaysia, New Zealand, the United Kingdom and the United States relating to the copyright. The Bill for an Act with this short title will usually have been known as a Copyright Bill during its passage through Parliament.

List

Australia
The Copyright Act 1968

Canada
The Copyright Act of Canada

Ghana
 Copyright Act, 2005.

Hong Kong
The Copyright Ordinance 1997

India
The Indian Copyright Act, 1957

Malaysia
The Copyright Act 1969
The Copyright Act 1987

New Zealand
The Copyright Act 1994

United Kingdom
The Statute of Anne or Copyright Act 1709, the first copyright act of the United Kingdom
The Copyright Act 1842
The Copyright Act 1911
The Copyright Act 1956 (4 & 5 Eliz.2 c.52)
The Copyright, Designs and Patents Act 1988, current copyright law of the United Kingdom

United States
The Copyright Act of 1790
The Copyright Act of 1831
The Copyright Act of 1870
The Copyright Act of 1909
The Copyright Act of 1976
The International Copyright Act of 1891

See also

List of copyright acts
International Copyright Act
List of short titles
:Category:Copyright law by country

Lists of legislation by short title